Corrente is a type of dance from the late Renaissance and the Baroque era.

Corrente or correntes may also refer to:

 Corrente (surname), including a list of people with the name
 Correntes, Pernambuco, a town in the state of Pernambuco, Northeast Region, Brazil
 Corrente, Piauí, a municipality in the Northeast Region of Brazil
 Corrente, an Italian carsharing service provided by Trasporto Passeggeri Emilia-Romagna
 Corrente River (disambiguation), several rivers named Corrente or Correntes

See also
 Cape Correntes, a headland in the Inhambane Province, Mozambique